Notogynaphallia is a genus of land planarians from South America.

Description 

The genus Notogynaphallia is characterized by having a small-to-medium, slender body with nearly parallel margins. The eyes are arranged along the body margins and may or not spread to the dorsum. The copulatory apparatus lacks a permanent penis, i. e., the penis is formed during copulation by folds in the male atrium. The male part of the copulatory apparatus also lacks an ejaculatory duct, so that the prostatic vesicle opens directly into the male atrium. The female atrium is usually irregular and narrow and the ovovitelline ducts join each other behind it.

Etymology 
The name Notogynaphallia comes from Greek νότος (back) + γυνή (female) + ἀ (without) + φαλλός (phallus, penis), i.e., "dorsal female without penis", referring to ovovitelline ducts entering the female atrium dorsally and the absence of a permanent penis.

Species 
There are nine species assigned to the genus Notogynaphallia:

Notogynaphallia biseminalis (Riester, 1938)
Notogynaphallia fortuita Negrete, Gira & Brusa, 2019
Notogynaphallia froehlichae 
Notogynaphallia modesta 
Notogynaphallia mourei 
Notogynaphallia nawei 
Notogynaphallia parca 
Notogynaphallia plumbea 
Notogynaphallia sexstriata 
Notogynaphallia urku 

Also, there are some species currently considered incertae sedis:

Notogynaphallia andina 
Notogynaphallia atra 
Notogynaphallia garua 
Notogynaphallia quinquestriata 

Several species formerly placed in Notogynaphallia are currently placed in the genera Imbira and Luteostriata.

References 

Geoplanidae
Rhabditophora genera